Tony Thorpe is an English footballer.

Tony Thorpe may also refer to:
 Tony Thorpe (musician) of the Rubettes
 Tony Thorpe (record producer) and artist of The Moody Boys